The Black Chronicle is an African-American weekly newspaper in the state of Oklahoma. Founded in April 1979 and based in Oklahoma City's Eastside, it is owned by Perry Publishing and Broadcasting and caters to Oklahoma City's black community. 
 Today, the Black Chronicle has the largest paid circulation among Oklahoma's weekly newspapers.

The Black Chronicle is descended from its predecessor, the Black Dispatch, which published since 1915, founded by Roscoe Dunjee and later published by John Dungee. After the death of John Dungee it was sold to a longtime employee, Russell Perry.

References

External links
 The Black Chronicle
 Perry Broadcasting

African-American history in Oklahoma City
African-American newspapers
Newspapers published in Oklahoma City